The Roman Catholic Diocese of Dori is a diocese located in the city of Dori in the Ecclesiastical province of Koupéla in Burkina Faso.

History
 November 20, 2004: Established as Diocese of Dori from the Diocese of Fada N’Gourma and Diocese of Ouahigouya

Leadership
 Bishops of Dori (Roman rite)
 Bishop Joachim Hermenegilde Ouédraogo (November 20, 2004 – November 4, 2011), appointed Bishop of Koudougou
 Bishop Laurent Birfuoré Dabiré (January 31, 2013 -)

See also
Roman Catholicism in Burkina Faso

References

External links
 GCatholic.org

Roman Catholic dioceses in Burkina Faso
Christian organizations established in 2004
Roman Catholic dioceses and prelatures established in the 21st century
Dori, Roman Catholic Diocese of